Randell Parker Byers (born October 2, 1964) is a former Major League Baseball left fielder who played for two seasons. He played for the San Diego Padres for ten games during the 1987 San Diego Padres season and 11 games during the 1988 San Diego Padres season.

Born in Bridgeton, New Jersey, Byers played prep baseball at Cumberland Regional High School.

References

External links

1964 births
Living people
Baseball players from New Jersey
CCBC–Catonsville Cardinals baseball players
Paris Dragons baseball players
San Diego Padres players
Sportspeople from Cumberland County, New Jersey
African-American baseball players
Beaumont Golden Gators players
Las Vegas Stars (baseball) players
Louisville Redbirds players
Spokane Indians players
21st-century African-American people
20th-century African-American sportspeople
People from Bridgeton, New Jersey
Charleston Rainbows players